Shaivonte Aician Gilgeous-Alexander (born July 12, 1998), also known by his initials SGA, is a Canadian professional basketball player for the Oklahoma City Thunder of the National Basketball Association (NBA). He also played one year of college basketball for the Kentucky Wildcats.

Gilgeous-Alexander was selected in the first round of the 2018 NBA draft by the Charlotte Hornets with the 11th overall pick and was traded to the Los Angeles Clippers that same night. He was named to the NBA All-Rookie Second Team in his rookie season with the Clippers before being traded to the Thunder in July 2019.

Early life
Gilgeous-Alexander was born in Toronto, Ontario, and grew up in Hamilton, Ontario. His mother, Charmaine Gilgeous, is a former track star who competed for Antigua and Barbuda at the 1992 Summer Olympics. His father, Vaughn Alexander, coached him as a youth. He began high school in Hamilton at St. Thomas More Catholic Secondary School before switching to Sir Allan MacNab Secondary School. He then transferred to Hamilton Heights Christian Academy (located in Chattanooga, Tennessee) for his junior and senior years to improve his basketball skills, graduating in 2017.

High school career
Growing up in Hamilton, he did not make the St. Thomas More junior team in grade 9 and subsequently played on the school's midget squad. He ended up winning team MVP and the midget boys' city championship. He then attended Sir Allan MacNab Secondary School before heading to Hamilton Heights Christian Academy in Chattanooga, Tennessee in 2015. "I just thought I needed to play better competition ...," he said. As a senior, Gilgeous-Alexander averaged 18.4 points, 4.4 rebounds and 4.0 assists.

In early 2016, he participated in the Basketball Without Borders Camp.

A four-star recruit (by ESPN), Gilgeous-Alexander originally committed to Florida, but re-opened his recruitment in October 2016. His final five schools were Kentucky, Kansas, Syracuse, Texas and UNLV. The following month, he announced his decision to play college basketball at Kentucky. At the 2017 Nike Hoop Summit, he represented the World Select Team and scored eleven points in 21 minutes of action.

College career
Gilgeous-Alexander started the 2017–18 season as a reserve, sitting behind freshman point guard Quade Green, but still averaged over 30 minutes per game. After a tough loss to UCLA, Alexander erupted against Louisville in December, scoring 24 points, grabbing 5 rebounds, dishing out 4 assists, and securing 3 steals. When he first stepped on the University of Kentucky's campus, Gilgeous-Alexander had long hair. However, he cut his hair early in the season and some say this started his progression from sixth man to starting point guard. He continued to lead the team for the following two games, scoring 21 points against Georgia and 18 against LSU. He was a consistent contributor to a "struggling" UK team that had a four-game losing streak during the season. He became a starter along with four other freshmen: Hamidou Diallo, Nick Richards, Kevin Knox, and P. J. Washington. Despite their losses, his PPG shot up to 12.9 along with 3.8 rebounds and 4.6 assists. Gilgeous-Alexander had a great  SEC tournament and continued that momentum into the NCAA Tournament. After playing great basketball in the first two rounds against Davidson and Buffalo, Kentucky lost to Kansas State in the Sweet 16. Gilgeous-Alexander's final college basketball moment was a missed three-point attempt at the buzzer. On April 9, 2018, he declared for the 2018 NBA Draft.

Professional career

Los Angeles Clippers (2018–2019)

2018–2019: Rookie season 

On June 21, 2018, Gilgeous-Alexander was selected with the eleventh overall pick by the Charlotte Hornets in the 2018 NBA draft, before being traded to the Los Angeles Clippers the same day, in exchange for the pick after him (which ended up being Miles Bridges) and two future second round picks. He went on to play for the team in the 2018 NBA Summer League, where he averaged 19 points, 4.8 rebounds, 4 assists and 2.3 steals per game.

On December 17, 2018, Gilgeous-Alexander scored a season-best of 24 points in a 127–131 loss to the Portland Trail Blazers. On January 18, 2019, Gilgeous-Alexander tied his season-best of 24 points in a 112–94 loss to the Golden State Warriors. Eleven days later, he was named a member of the World Team representing Canada for the 2019 Rising Stars Challenge. On April 21, 2019, he scored a new career-high of 25 points in a 105–113 loss to the Golden State Warriors in Game 4 of the 2019 playoffs.

Oklahoma City Thunder (2019–present)

2019–2020: Improving as a sophomore 
On July 10, 2019, the Clippers traded Gilgeous-Alexander, Danilo Gallinari, five first-round draft picks, and the rights to swap two other first round picks to the Oklahoma City Thunder for NBA All-Star Paul George. On October 8, 2019, Gilgeous-Alexander made his preseason debut with the Oklahoma City Thunder against the Dallas Mavericks. He recorded 24 points and four rebounds in a 119–104 win over the Mavericks. On December 22, 2019, Gilgeous-Alexander scored a then career-high 32 points with five assists, three rebounds, and two steals in a 118–112 win over the Los Angeles Clippers. On January 13, 2020, Gilgeous-Alexander recorded his first NBA triple double with 20 points, 10 assists and a career-high 20 rebounds in a 117–104 win over the Minnesota Timberwolves, becoming the second player after Russell Westbrook to record a 20–20–10 statline in the last 30 years and the youngest ever to achieve it.

2020–2022: Breakthrough and injuries 
On December 26, 2020, Gilgeous-Alexander put up 24 points, seven rebounds, nine assists, and a game-winning jump shot in a 109–107 win against the Charlotte Hornets. On February 24, 2021, Gilgeous-Alexander scored a then career-high 42 points to give the Oklahoma City Thunder a 102–99 win over the San Antonio Spurs. On March 24, 2021, after playing 35 games, his season ended due to a tear in his plantar fascia.

On August 3, 2021, Gilgeous-Alexander and the Thunder agreed to a five-year, $172 million rookie extension that will become a five-year, $207 million rookie maximum extension if Gilgeous-Alexander is included on an All-NBA Team. On December 18, 2021, Gilgeous-Alexander scored 18 points and made a game-winning three-pointer at the buzzer to lift the Thunder over his former team, the Los Angeles Clippers, 104–103. Four days later, he recorded his second career triple double, with 27 points, 11 rebounds and 12 assists, in a 108–94 victory over the Denver Nuggets. On December 27, Gilgeous-Alexander was named the NBA Western Conference Player of the Week for Week 10 (December 20–26), his first NBA Player of the Week award. He led Oklahoma to a 3–1 week with averages of 27.5 points, 6.3 rebounds and 7.0 assists. On March 28, 2022, Gilgeous-Alexander was ruled out for the rest of the season with an ankle injury.  He finished the season averaging career highs of 24.5 points and 5.9 assists per game.

2022–present: First All-Star selection 
On October 31, 2022, Gilgeous-Alexander was named the NBA Western Conference Player of the Week for Week 2 (October 24–30), his second career NBA Player of the Week award. He led Oklahoma to an undefeated 3–0 week with averages of 31.7 points, 5.3 rebounds and 7.7 assists. On November 16, Gilgeous-Alexander tied a then career-high with 42 points, alongside a game-winning three-pointer, six rebounds and seven assists, in a 121–120 win over the Washington Wizards. On December 19, Gilgeous-Alexander put up 35 points alongside a buzzer-beating game-winner in a 123–121 win over the Portland Trail Blazers. On December 23, Gilgeous-Alexander recorded a career-high 44 points, with 10 rebounds and 6 assists, in a 128–125 overtime loss against the New Orleans Pelicans.

On February 2, 2023, Gilgeous-Alexander was named to his first-ever NBA All-Star Game as a reserve guard for the Western Conference. On February 4, he recorded 42 points, four rebounds, six assists, three steals and two blocks in a 153–121 win over the Houston Rockets. On February 10, Gilgeous-Alexander tied his career-high with 44 points on 13-of-16 shooting from the field and 18-of-19 shooting from the free throw line in a 138–129 win over the Portland Trail Blazers. He became the first player in Thunder history to score 40-plus points on 80% shooting.

National team career
Gilgeous-Alexander played for Canada’s Junior National Team that competed in the 2016 FIBA Americas Under-18 Championship in Valdivia, Chile, averaging 7.8 points, 5.4 assists, 4.0 rebounds in a contest en route to winning silver. He also played for Canada's National Team at the 2016 FIBA World Olympic Qualifying Tournament in Manila.

On May 24, 2022, Gilgeous-Alexander agreed to a three-year commitment to play with the Canadian senior men's national team.

Career statistics

NBA

Regular season

|-
| style="text-align:left;"|
| style="text-align:left;"|L.A. Clippers
| style="background:#cfecec;"|82* || 73 || 26.5 || .476 || .367 || .800 || 2.8 || 3.3 || 1.2 || .5 || 10.8
|-
| style="text-align:left;"|
| style="text-align:left;"|Oklahoma City
| 70 || 70 || 34.7 || .471 || .347 || .807 || 5.9 || 3.3 || 1.1 || .7 || 19.0
|-
| style="text-align:left;"|
| style="text-align:left;"|Oklahoma City
| 35 || 35 || 33.7 || .508 || .418 || .808 || 4.7 || 5.9 || .8 || .7 || 23.7
|-
| style="text-align:left;"|
| style="text-align:left;"|Oklahoma City
| 56 || 56 || 34.7 || .453 || .300 || .810 || 5.0 || 5.9 || 1.3 || .8 || 24.5
|- class="sortbottom"
| style="text-align:center;" colspan="2"|Career
| 243 || 234 || 31.8 || .473 || .348 || .807 || 4.5 || 4.3 || 1.1 || .7 || 18.2
|- class="sortbottom"
| style="text-align:center;" colspan="2"| All-Star
| 1 || 0 || 10.0 || .800 || 1.000 || .000 || 2.0 || 7.0 || .0 || .0 || 9.0

Playoffs

|-
| style="text-align:left;"|2019
| style="text-align:left;"|L.A. Clippers
| 6 || 6 || 28.8 || .467 || .500 || .850 || 2.7 || 3.2 || 1.0 || .8 || 13.7
|-
| style="text-align:left;"|2020
| style="text-align:left;"|Oklahoma City
| 7 || 7 || 39.9 || .433 || .400 || .957 || 5.3 || 4.1 || 1.0 || .4 || 16.3
|- class="sortbottom"
| style="text-align:center;" colspan="2"|Career
| 13 || 13 || 34.8 || .447 || .434 || .907 || 4.1 || 3.7 || 1.0 || .6 || 15.1

College

|-
| style="text-align:left;"|2017–18
| style="text-align:left;"|Kentucky
| 37 || 24 || 33.7 || .485 || .404 || .817 || 4.1 || 5.1 || 1.6 || .5|| 14.4

Personal life
Gilgeous-Alexander's younger brother, Thomasi, was a college basketball player for the Evansville Purple Aces. and Northeastern Oklahoma A&M. His younger cousin, Nickeil Alexander-Walker, is an NBA player for the Minnesota Timberwolves. The two have a close relationship and shared a room at high school coach Zach Ferrell's house.

In July 2020, Gilgeous-Alexander signed an endorsement deal with Converse.

References

External links

 Kentucky Wildcats bio
 Shai Gilgeous-Alexander at nbadraft.net

1998 births
Living people
Basketball players from Toronto
Canadian expatriate basketball people in the United States
Canadian men's basketball players
Canadian people of Antigua and Barbuda descent
Charlotte Hornets draft picks
Kentucky Wildcats men's basketball players
Los Angeles Clippers players
National Basketball Association players from Canada
Oklahoma City Thunder players
Point guards